The Richard Godfrey House is a historic house located at 62 County Street in Taunton, Massachusetts.

Description and history 
It is a -story, wood-framed structure, with a side-gable gambrel roof (with two gable-roofed dormers), a central chimney, and clapboard siding. The main facade is five bays wide, symmetrically arranged, with a center entrance that has simple trim. It was built in about 1750 in the "Neck-o-Land" section of the town, near the Mill River where early industries developed. It is a rare surviving early gambrel-roofed structure within the city.

The house was listed on the National Register of Historic Places on July 5, 1984.

See also
National Register of Historic Places listings in Taunton, Massachusetts

References

National Register of Historic Places in Taunton, Massachusetts
Houses in Taunton, Massachusetts
Houses on the National Register of Historic Places in Bristol County, Massachusetts